"Back to You" is a song recorded by American singer Selena Gomez. it appears as an international bonus track on Gomez's third studio album, Rare (2020) And was written by Gomez, Parrish Warrington, Diederik Van Elsas, Amy Allen, and Micah Premnath. The production was handled by Ian Kirkpatrick and Trackside. The track was released on May 10, 2018, as the lead single from the second season soundtrack of 13 Reasons Why, a TV adaptation of the eponymous book.

Commercially, the song reached the top five in Australia, Canada, the Czech Republic, Greece, Hungary, Ireland, Malaysia, the Netherlands, Poland, Singapore and Slovakia; the top ten in Belgium, Finland, New Zealand, Norway, Portugal and Scotland; as well as the top 20 in Denmark, Germany, Switzerland, Sweden, the United Kingdom and the United States. In the US, the song also became Gomez's 15th consecutive top 40 entry on the Billboard Hot 100, peaking at number 18.

Background and release
Before its official announcement, the song was registered in ASCAP and teased by various US radio stations such as 104.7 KISS FM. Gomez finally confirmed the release through social media on May 1, as well as its inclusion on the soundtrack of the second season of the Netflix's original series 13 Reasons Why, in which she takes part as an executive producer. The song premiered on May 10 in Zane Lowe's Apple Music radio show Beats 1 as the release day's "World Record". She was also interviewed by Lowe and confirmed that her third solo studio album was being completed.

Composition
"Back to You" was written by Parrish Warrington, Diederik Van Elsas, Amy Allen, Micah Premnath, and Selena Gomez. The production was handled by Trackside and Ian Kirkpatrick, the latter also working on Gomez's previous single "Bad Liar". The track has been described as an emotional acoustic midtempo with country influences, being also called a "dance-pop anthem", as well as an electropop and EDM ballad. Gomez said that it was a "very special record" and that she wanted it to be "a beautiful message in a really complicated way but really fun".

The song is performed in the key of F major with a tempo of 102 beats per minute in 4/4 time and follows a chord progression of Dm–B–F. Gomez's vocal range spans two octaves, from C3 to C5.

Music video
A lyric video with scenes of the second season of 13 Reasons Why was released on May 10, 2018.

Release and synopsis
The official music video was directed by Scott Cudmore. The imagery for the music video is inspired from the 1965 French New Wave film Pierrot le Fou. The music video starts at a party with Gomez, dressed in a vintage feather-trimmed green sequined high-neck dress, locking eyes with a sharply suited man (Andrey Kupchenko), and they steal a convertible and end up frolicking in a bucolic pasture. Gomez wears an ensemble fit for the French countryside: a vintage white skirt and a sleeveless orange-and-yellow crop top. and take Gomez's twist on iconic ’60s French-girl style as some summer style inspiration.

Nevertheless, Gomez's video, is saturated with Godard's quintessential filmmaking quirks: fragmented editing; characters breaking the fourth wall; melodramatic dialogue; a garish, primary color-focused palette; and cartoonish neorealism. Cinemaphiles will immediately notice parallels, as the music video's opening visual directly mirrors the famous party scene in "Pierrot le Fou," both doused in deep, ever-changing colors. The inane dialogue from side characters serves to highlight the shallow, bourgeois lifestyle that Pierrot wants to escape from. The two find they are wanted and burn their car to destroy the evidence. The video returns to the party from the start and despite everything, Gomez cycles back, locks eyes with the sharply dressed man and asks: "Do you want to steal a car?".

Accolades

Track listing
Digital download
 "Back to You" – 3:30

Riton and Kah-Lo remix
 "Back to You" (Riton and Kah-Lo remix) – 3:27

Joey Pecoraro remix
 "Back to You" (Joey Pecoraro remix) – 3:46

Anki Remix
 "Back to You" (Anki remix) – 4:41

Credits and personnel
Credits and personnel adapted from Rare album liner notes.

Selena Gomez – lead vocals, songwriting
 Amy Allen – background vocals, songwriting
 Micah Premnath – background vocals, songwriting
 Parrish Warrington – songwriting
 Diederik Van Elsas – songwriting
 Ian Kirkpatrick – production

 Trackside – production
 Benjamin Rice – vocal production
 Tony Maserati – mixing
 Tyler Scott – mix engineering assistance
Chris Gehringer – mastering

Charts

Weekly charts

Year-end charts

Certifications

Release history

References

2018 songs
2018 singles
Selena Gomez songs
Interscope Records singles
Songs from television series
Songs written by Selena Gomez
Songs written by Amy Allen (songwriter)
Song recordings produced by Ian Kirkpatrick (record producer)
2010s ballads
Electropop ballads